Year 1452 (MCDLII) was a leap year starting on Saturday (link will display the full calendar) of the Julian calendar.

Events 
 January–December 
 February – Alexăndrel retakes the throne of Moldavia, in his long struggle with Petru Aron.
 February 22 – William Douglas, 8th Earl of Douglas is killed by James II of Scotland, at Stirling Castle.
 March 17 – Reconquista – Battle of Los Alporchones (around the city of Lorca in Murcia): The combined forces of the Kingdom of Castile, and its subsidiary kingdom of Murcia, defeat the Emirate of Granada.
 March 19 – Frederick III, Holy Roman Emperor, becomes the last to be crowned in Rome.
 May 31 – Revolt of Ghent: Philip the Good, Duke of Burgundy, officially declares war on Ghent.
 June 18 – Pope Nicholas V issues the bull Dum Diversas, legitimising the colonial slave trade.
 October
 English troops under John Talbot, 1st Earl of Shrewsbury, land in Guyenne, France, and retake most of the province without a fight.
 Byzantine–Ottoman Wars: The Ottoman governor of Thessaly, Turakhan Beg, breaks through the Hexamilion wall for the fourth time, and ravages the Peloponnese Peninsula to prevent the Byzantine Despotate of the Morea from assisting Constantinople, during the final Ottoman siege of the imperial capital.

 Date unknown 
 A major volcanic eruption, 1452/1453 mystery eruption, has a subsequent global cooling effect (the eruption releases more sulfate than any other event in the previous 700 years).
 Portuguese navigator Diogo de Teive discovers the islands of Corvo and Flores, in the Azores.
 Battle of Bealach nam Broig, a Scottish clan battle.
 Edinburgh officially becomes the capital of the Kingdom of Scotland.

Births 

 February 6 – Joanna, Princess of Portugal (d. 1490)
 February 14 
Davide Ghirlandaio, Italian painter and mosaicist (d. 1525)
 Pandolfo Petrucci, tyrant of Siena (d. 1512)
 March 10 – King Ferdinand II of Aragon, Aragonese king and first king of a united Spain (by marriage to Isabella of Castile) (d. 1516)
 April 15 – Leonardo da Vinci, Italian artist and inventor (d. 1519)
 April 19 – King Frederick of Naples (d. 1504)
 May 18 – Henry the Younger of Poděbrady, Bohemian nobleman (d. 1492)
 July 27
 Ludovico Sforza, Duke of Milan (d. 1508)
 Lucrezia Crivelli, mistress of Ludovico Sforza (d. 1508)
 August 12 – Abraham Zacuto, Spanish Jewish astronomer, astrologer, mathematician, rabbi and historian (d. 1515)
 September 21 – Girolamo Savonarola, Italian religious reformer (d. 1498)
 October 2 – King Richard III of England (d. 1485)
 December 6 – Antonio Mancinelli, Italian humanist pedagogue and grammarian (d. 1505)
 December 10 – Johannes Stöffler, German mathematician (d. 1531)
 Date unknown
 Diogo Cão, Portuguese explorer (d. 1486)
 Lucrezia Crivelli, mistress of Ludovico Sforza of Milan (d. 1508) (approximate date)

Deaths 

 February 10 
 Švitrigaila, Grand Prince of Lithuania
 Michał Bolesław Zygmuntowicz (Michael Žygimantaitis), Prince of Black Ruthenia
 February 14 – Konrad VII the White, Duke of Oleśnica
 February 22 – William Douglas, 8th Earl of Douglas (b. 1425)
 April 20 – Reinhard III, Count of Hanau (1451–1452) (b. 1412)
 May – John Stafford, Archbishop of Canterbury
 October – Nicholas Close, English bishop
 probable – Gemistus Pletho, Greek philosopher

References